Nayelis López Rodríguez (born 5 February 2001) is a Dominican futsal player and a footballer who plays as a goalkeeper for Cibao FC and the Dominican Republic women's national team.

International career
López represented the Dominican Republic at the 2018 Summer Youth Olympics and the 2020 CONCACAF Women's U-20 Championship. She made her senior debut on 21 February 2021 in a 0–2 friendly home loss to Puerto Rico.

References

2001 births
Living people
Dominican Republic women's footballers
Women's association football goalkeepers
Dominican Republic women's international footballers
Dominican Republic women's futsal players
Futsal goalkeepers
Futsal players at the 2018 Summer Youth Olympics